Alain Cigana (born 10 December 1950) is a French former professional racing cyclist. He rode in three editions of the Tour de France.

References

External links
 

1950 births
Living people
French male cyclists
Sportspeople from Gironde
Cyclists from Nouvelle-Aquitaine